Never Kiss Your Best Friend Lockdown Season was release on ZEE5 starring Nakuul Mehta, Anya Singh, Jaaved Jaaferi, Zain Imam and Niki Walia. It consists of 10 episodes each running approximately 9 to 16 Minutes. Lockdown season was written by Durjoy Datta and Sumrit Shahi, directed by Arif Khan and produced by Sarita A. Tanwar and Niraj Kothari.

Plot 
Two best friends find themselves locking lips, and it shouldn't. The lockdown special edition continues from where it left off. Tanie, who is still in a relationship with Sumer, is convinced that she made the worst mistake of her entire life by kissing her boyfriend Sumer. Love and friendship can't be mixed together.

Cast 
Anya Singh as Tanie Brar
Nakuul Mehta as Sumer Dhillion
Jaaved Jaaferi as Bitttu Mama
Zain Imam as Zayed: Anya's ex
Nikki Walia as Happy Brar
Rituraj Singh as Sumer's Father

References

External Links 
 Never Kiss Your Best Friend ( Lockdown Season) at IMDb
 Never Kiss Your Best Friend (Lockdown Season) at ZEE5

Indian romance television series
Indian web series